David Booysen was a South African Afrikaner professional rugby league footballer who played in the 1920s. David Booysen played for Wigan in the same era as fellow South African Afrikaner Attie van Heerden.

Playing career

International honours
David Booysen won cap(s) for Other Nationalities while at Wigan against England.

Championship final appearances
David Booysen played  in Wigan's 22-10 victory over Warrington in the Championship Final during the 1925–26 season at Knowsley Road, St. Helens on Saturday 8 May 1926.

County League appearances
David Booysen played in Wigan's victory in the Lancashire County League during the 1925–26 season.

County Cup Final appearances
David Booysen played left-, i.e. number 4, in Wigan's 11-15 defeat by Swinton in the 1925–26 Lancashire County Cup Final during the 1925–26 season at The Cliff, Broughton on Wednesday 9 December 1925.

References

External links
Search for "Booysen" at espnscrum.com

Afrikaner people
Expatriate rugby league players in England
Other Nationalities rugby league team players
Place of birth missing
Place of death missing
Rugby league centres
Rugby league halfbacks
South African expatriate rugby league players
South African expatriate sportspeople in England
South African rugby league players
Wigan Warriors players
Year of birth missing
Year of death missing